The Mysteries is a version of the medieval English mystery plays first presented at London's National Theatre in 1977. The cycle of three plays tells the story of the Bible from the creation to the last judgement.

Background
It is based largely on the Wakefield cycle of plays (but incorporating some scenes from the York,  Chester and Coventry canons) and adapted by poet Tony Harrison, working with the original cast, into three parts: Nativity, The Passion and Doomsday. Directed by Bill Bryden, it was first performed on Easter Saturday 1977 on the terrace of the National Theatre building on the South Bank, London. It then went into the repertoire in the Cottesloe Theatre (part of the South Bank complex) until 20 April 1985  when  the Cottesloe went 'dark'. Later in 1985 it transferred with a slightly different cast (Barrie Rutter playing Herod & Pontius Pilate, and Barry Foster as Lucifer/Judas/Satan) to the Lyceum Theatre—then in use as a ballroom and so without seating.

Harrison's concept was to present the original stories as "plays-within-plays", using as his characters the naïve but pious craftsmen and guild members, to some extent modernised to represent the trades of today—God, for example, created the world with the help of a real fork-lift truck— acting out the parts of the story that their  mediaeval counterparts would have done. At the start of each performance actors dressed as tradesmen welcomed the audience. The performance was a promenade one, with the audience mingling with the actors and making up the crowd at such scenes as the last judgement. The Evening Standard reported witnessing "An extraordinary experience... no wonder the end of it all saw an explosion of communal joyousness with everybody, actors, musicians, and audience alike, cheering and clapping and singing and dancing."

Cast 
Many well known actors appeared in the productions, including Brenda Blethyn, Kenneth Cranham, Edna Doré, Lynn Farleigh, Brian Glover (as God),  Karl Johnson (as Jesus), Richard Johnson, Mark McManus, Eve Matheson (as Eve), Jack Shepherd and Robert Stephens (as Herod).

Cast of the 1985 National Theatre production 
The Nativity

The Passion

Doomsday

The actor and musician John Tams and his Home Service band provided the folk music accompaniment and a selection of tracks from it was published on CD.

The 1985 Cottesloe version was filmed for Channel 4 Television. A revival of the cycle, again directed by Bryden and featuring some of the original cast, was chosen by the National Theatre to mark the millennium celebration in 2000.

Awards
The productions won Bill Bryden the "Best Director" title in both the Evening Standard Theatre Awards and the Olivier Awards for 1985, the year the three plays first appeared together in performance at the Lyceum Theatre. Other awards were: Sydney Edwards Award for Best Director; Olivier for Designer of the Year for William Dudley; City Limits award for Best Director, and for Best Designer; Plays and Players for Best Director and Best Designer.

References

Further reading and viewing

1985 Channel 4 recording of the Cottesloe Theatre performance on Youtube

1977 plays
English plays
Medieval drama